"Tomorrow" is a song by American rapper GloRilla, released as a single from Collective Music Group's compilation album Gangsta Art (2022) on July 15, 2022. It was produced by Macaroni Toni. On September 23, 2022, the official remix of the song, titled "Tomorrow 2", with American rapper Cardi B was released. The remix peaked at number 9 on the Billboard Hot 100.

Composition
The song features piano chords and bass in the production. GloRilla raps in an aggressive manner, while lyrically she dismisses her detractors and raps about her good qualities, keeping her circle close but being "kinda ratchet still", as well as her status and standards with an optimistic tone. On the remix, Cardi B also targets her haters and brags about being better than others. She acknowledges rapper Ice Spice by interpolating her song "Munch (Feelin' U)".

Tomorrow 2 

"Tomorrow 2" is the official remix of "Tomorrow" by GloRilla. The remix includes a guest verse from American rapper Cardi B, and is included on GloRilla's debut extended play (EP), Anyways, Life's Great.... "Tomorrow 2" also received an official music video.

Critical reception
Both versions of "Tomorrow" were received positively, with "Tomorrow 2" receiving universal acclaim. Both Eddie Fu of Consequence and Tom Briehan of Stereogum praised the compatibility of GloRilla and Cardi B's collaboration. Breihan also called the latter's shoutout to Ice Spice to be "worth quoting". Mankaprr Conteh of Rolling Stone wrote, "While GloRilla's baddie quips can be pretty funny, Cardi B brings even more levity to the song with her characteristic humor." Andrew Unterberger of Billboard highlighted Cardi's verse in particular, calling it "her most vicious guest verse in years".

"Tomorrow 2" was listed on numerous year-end lists for 2022, including that of HipHopDX, which listed the track as the Best Hip-Hop Collaboration of 2022 and noted that "there may not have been a more perfectly paired Hip Hop duo this year" than GloRilla and Cardi. "Tomorrow 2" was also featured on Rolling Stone's and Billboard's 100 Best Songs of 2022 lists, with it placing as the highest-listed song by a female rapper on the latter.

Music video
A music video for the song was released alongside the single. It shows GloRilla and her friends partying and twerking at an airport tarmac, inside a private jet, and on a Bentley. They hold stacks of cash throughout the video as well.

The music video for "Tomorrow 2" was directed by Diesel Filmz and released on September 23, 2022. In it, GloRilla and her friends go wild in the New York city streets. She is seen ghost riding in neon cars while wearing a ski mask, and dancing with her friends on stoops and in a bodega, where they grab snacks as well (GloRilla gets some Takis). They continue dancing and twerking through the city's subway station and in the train, also pole-dancing on subway poles. Later, Cardi B joins GloRilla on a rooftop, and has a house party with GloRilla and her crew.

Live performances
GloRilla performed a snippet song during a medley with "F.N.F. (Let's GO)" at the 2022 BET Hip Hop Awards. Cardi B joined her for a full performance of "Tomorrow 2" at the American Music Awards of 2022.

Charts

Weekly charts

Year-end charts

Certifications

References

2022 singles
2022 songs
Songs written by GloRilla
Songs written by Cardi B
GloRilla songs
Cardi B songs
Interscope Records singles
Collective Music Group singles